Guy Whimper (born May 21, 1983) is a former American football offensive tackle. He was drafted in the fourth round (129th overall) of the 2006 NFL Draft by the New York Giants. Whimper played college football at East Carolina University.

Whimper has also been a member of the Jacksonville Jaguars and Pittsburgh Steelers.

Professional career
He was waived by the New York Giants on September 4, 2010.

Jacksonville Jaguars
Whimper was signed by the Jacksonville Jaguars on November 2, 2010.

On October 28, 2012, Whimper was made an eligible receiver and successfully caught a pass for a touchdown against the Green Bay Packers.

Whimper was released by the Jaguars on February 27, 2013.

Pittsburgh Steelers
On May 6, 2013, Whimper was signed by the Pittsburgh Steelers.

Whimper was seen as extremely unlikely to make the Steelers' roster, much less play, and much less than that play well. Due to an injury to tackle Marcus Gilbert and poor play by OT Mike Adams, Whimper played extensively against the Baltimore Ravens on October 20, and in the face of much skepticism, played well. On March 17, 2014, the Steelers re-signed Whimper to a one-year contract.

References

External links

1983 births
Living people
African-American players of American football
American football offensive tackles
East Carolina Pirates football players
New York Giants players
Jacksonville Jaguars players
Pittsburgh Steelers players
21st-century African-American sportspeople
20th-century African-American people